Anthony Eyre  (9 January 1727 – 14 February 1788) was a British landowner and politician who sat in the House of Commons between  1774 and 1784.
 
Eyre was the eldest surviving son  of Anthony Eyre and his wife, Margaret Turner, daughter of Charles Turner of Kirkleatham, Yorkshire. He matriculated at Christ Church, Oxford on 11 December 1745. In 1748 he succeeded to his father's estates of Rampton near East Retford,  Laughton-en-le-Morthen in south Yorkshire and Adwick le Street near Doncaster. He married Judith Letitia Bury, daughter of John Bury of Grange, near  Grantham in 1755. She brought into the family the manor of Headon, and lands around Bilsby in eastern Lincolnshire, which were inherited from the Johnson family. In 1762, Eyre sold the Adwick estate and having acquired Grove Park near East Retford, and other land at Grove, Little Gringley and Ordsall, moved back to Nottinghamshire. He sold the Laughton estate in 1767.

Eyre was returned as Member of Parliament for Boroughbridge on the interest of the Duke of Newcastle at the 1774 general election. . He was returned unopposed in 1780. In 1783 he voted against Newcastle on a matter of principle and in a letter of apology commented that he did not expect to be brought in at the 1784 general election and did not stand. 
          
Eyre died  in 1788 and was buried at Rampton All Saints, where he has a monument.

References

External links
University of Nottingham Biography of Anthony Eyre (1727-1788)
Southwell and Nottingham Church History Project – Rampton All Saints Monuments and Memorials

1727 births
1788 deaths
Alumni of Christ Church, Oxford
Members of the Parliament of Great Britain for English constituencies
British MPs 1774–1780
British MPs 1780–1784
People from Bassetlaw District